Shehadeh or Shehade is a surname. Notable people with the name include:

 Bassel Shehadeh (1984–2012), Syrian Christian film maker and producer
 Edmon Shehadeh (1933–2017), Palestinian poet
 Michel Shehadeh (born 1956), executive director of the Arab Film Festival
 Mohammed Shehadeh, civil engineer
 Mtanes Shehadeh (born 1972), Israeli Arab politician
 Raghdan Shehadeh ((born 1977), Syrian footballer
 Raja Shehadeh (born 1951), Palestinian lawyer and writer
 Sami Abu Shehadeh, Israeli Arab politician
 Salah Shehade (1953–2002), member of Hamas